Nankai Cheng, literally Nankai Castle or Nankai City is a commercial pedestrian street owned by Chongqing Nankai Zhongxue (Chongqing Nankai Middle School). It is located in Chenjiawan, Shapingba Chongqing, China.

Geography of Chongqing
Pedestrian malls in China